Jefferson Souza may refer to:

 Jefferson Souza (water polo) (1908-1992), Brazilian water polo player
 Jefferson Souza (footballer) (born 1989), Brazilian football midfielder
 Jefferson de Souza (born 1995), Norwegian football forward

See also
 Jefferson (footballer, born 1970), Jefferson Tomaz de Souza, Brazilian football midfielder